Peyrusse-Grande is a commune in the Gers department in southwestern France.

Geography

Localisation

Hydrography 
The Auzoue forms part of the commune's eastern border.

The Douze forms most of the commune's western border.

Population

See also
Communes of the Gers department

References

Communes of Gers
Gers communes articles needing translation from French Wikipedia